Robert William Moore (15 August 1905 – 27 October 1945) was an Irish first-class cricketer.

Moore was born in the United States at Brookland, Washington, D.C. Moving to Ireland during his childhood, he was educated at Friends' School, Lisburn. He played his club cricket in Belfast for Cliftonville from 1922. Moore toured England and Wales with Ireland in June 1926, making his debut in first-class cricket on the tour against Oxford University at Oxford. Weeks later he played a second first-class match against Wales at Belfast. He scored 51 runs in these two matches, with a highest score of 22. Moore played club cricket for Cliftonville until 1934, after which he moved to Derry, where he played for City of Derry. He later played a minor match for Ireland against the Marylebone Cricket Club at Strabane in 1934. He later moved to England, where he died at Rochdale in October 1945.

References

External links

1905 births
1945 deaths
People from Washington, D.C.
People educated at Friends' School, Lisburn
Cricketers from Northern Ireland
Irish cricketers
Irish expatriate sportspeople in England